Until 2013, the Shawn Hornbeck Foundation was a non-profit charitable organization based in Richwoods, Missouri, devoted to the search for and rescue of abducted children. It ran the Shawn Hornbeck Search and Rescue Team.

The rescue team was founded by Pam and Craig Akers following the disappearance of their son Shawn Hornbeck (born July 17, 1991). Hornbeck was eleven years old on October 6, 2002, when he was kidnapped while riding his bicycle near his home in Richwoods, Missouri. Shawn Hornbeck was missing for over four years before being discovered on January 12, 2007, along with another teenage boy, Ben Ownby. They had been kidnapped by Michael J. Devlin.

The Shawn Hornbeck Search and Rescue Team was a member of NASAR (National Association for Search and Rescue) and a member of SARCOM (Search and Rescue Council of Missouri). It was also involved with the National Search Dog Association.

History 
The Akers founded the Shawn Hornbeck Search and Rescue Team following the disappearance of their son Shawn Hornbeck. Hornbeck was eleven years old when he was kidnapped while riding his bicycle near his Richwoods, Missouri home on October 6, 2002.

Shortly after Hornbeck's disappearance, his parents appeared on The Montel Williams Show, where self-described psychic Sylvia Browne erroneously told the Akers that Hornbeck was dead. Browne also described the abduction, telling them several things about the abductor that later proved to be incorrect.

Hornbeck was missing for over four years before being discovered on January 12, 2007. Police were searching for 13-year-old Ben Ownby of Beaufort, Missouri, who had gone missing earlier that week. Aided by a descriptive tip from teenager Mitchell Hults of Beaufort, Missouri, police searched Michael J. Devlin's apartment in Kirkwood, Missouri. Hornbeck and Ownby were both found alive there.

Prosecution 
In June 2007, Devlin was charged with 80 counts in the abductions and molestations of Hornbeck and Ownby. On October 8, 2007, Devlin pleaded guilty to all charges filed against him and was sentenced to life imprisonment.

See also 

 Laura Recovery Center
 Polly Klaas Foundation
 Texas EquuSearch

References 

Charities based in Missouri
Child abduction in the United States
Children's charities based in the United States
Child abuse in the United States